Saung Einmet (Death is a Night) is a 1967 Burmese black-and-white psycho thriller drama film, directed by Htun Htun starring Win Oo(In his double lead role), Bo Ba Ko, Aye Aye Thin, Tin Tin Aye, Kyaw Pe, Khin Lay Swe and Myint Htay. Win Oo won the Best Actor Award in 1967 Myanmar Motion Picture Academy Awards for this film.

Cast
Win Oo as Kyaw Min
Bo Ba Ko as the Doctor
Aye Aye Thin as Nu Nu Mar
Tin Tin Aye as Myint Myint Nwe
Kyaw Pe as Kyaw Min's father
Khin Lay Swe as Kyaw Min's mother
Myint Htay as Young Kyaw Min, Kyaw Min's young life

References

1967 films
1960s Burmese-language films
Burmese thriller films
Films shot in Myanmar
1960s thriller films